The Odd Fellows' Hall is a historic Odd Fellows' hall at 1-5 State Street on the Buckland side of Shelburne Falls, Massachusetts.  Built in 1877, and rebuilt after a damaging fire in 1895, it has been a focal point of the business district on the Buckland side of the village since its construction, serving an active Odd Fellows chapter until 1963.  The building was listed on the National Register of Historic Places in 1979.  In 1988 it was included in the Shelburne Falls Historic District.

Description and history
The Odd Fellows Hall occupies a prominent location on the Buckland side of Shelburne Falls village, on the west side of State Street just south of the Deerfield River bridge joining Buckland to the Shelburne side of the village.  It is a three-story wood frame structure, with a clapboarded exterior.  The ground floor has two storefronts (presently unified in a single business), with recessed entrances flanked by large display windows.  These are sheltered by a full-length portico support by large decorative brackets.  The second floor has two groupings of three sash windows, and the third floor has a pair of Palladian window groupings.  The building is crowned by a dentillated cornice and parapet. 

The Shelburne Falls Odd Fellows chapter was organized in 1848, and originally met in space in another commercial building (no longer extant).  After a major fire destroyed most of the commercial buildings on the Buckland side of the village in 1876, the chapter purchased a lot previously occupied by a hotel, and had this building erected.  It was extensively damaged by fire in 1895, but the Odd Fellows rebuilt it.  They used the building until 1962, after which it has served retail and commercial purposes.  The building is notable in the village as one of the few surviving buildings in the village built with Victorian-era balloon framing methods.

See also
 National Register of Historic Places listings in Franklin County, Massachusetts
 List of Odd Fellows buildings
 Independent Order of Odd Fellows Building
 Independent Order of Odd Fellows Hall
 Odd Fellows Block
 Odd Fellows Building
 Odd Fellows Hall
 Odd Fellows Lodge
 Odd Fellows Temple

References

Clubhouses on the National Register of Historic Places in Massachusetts
Odd Fellows buildings in Massachusetts
Buildings and structures in Franklin County, Massachusetts
National Register of Historic Places in Franklin County, Massachusetts
Historic district contributing properties in Massachusetts
Buckland, Massachusetts